Philipp Petzschner and Alexander Peya were the defending champions; however, they chose to not participate this year.
Karol Beck and Jaroslav Levinský won in the final 2–6, 7–5, 10–7, against David Škoch and Igor Zelenay.

Seeds

Draw

Draw

External links
 Doubles Draw

Internationaux du Doubs - Open de Franche-Comte - Doubles